Kempten (Allgäu) Hauptbahnhof is a railway station in Kempten in the German state of Bavaria. It is the most important station of Kempten and a hub for the Neu-Ulm–Kempten railway, the Buchloe–Lindau railway and the Ausserfern Railway. The original Kempten station was built in 1852 as a terminal station near the centre of town and was replaced by a through station in 1969.

History 
The first Kempten station was built during the construction of the Ludwig South-North Railway, opened on 1 April 1852 between Kaufbeuren and Kempten and extended on 1 May 1853 from Kempten to Immenstadt. As, on the one hand, it was desirable for the station to be as close to the city centre as possible, and on the other hand, a crossing of the deep Iller Valley at a reasonable cost was only possible at a narrow point one kilometre south of the city, it was decided to build a terminus, used for both passengers and freight. In 1853, the station was equipped with a structure designated as the "administration building", a covered “home” platform, an entrance hall and a freight shed. The administration building had three full floors and a mezzanine, a low sloping roof supported by purlins, reflecting the traditional architecture of the Alpine foothills.  The "unusual highly stilted building" was typical of many commercial buildings from the early days of the industrial revolution.

The commissioning of the Neu-Ulm–Kempten railway on 1 June 1863 and a substantial increase in traffic led to the first reconstructions of the platform and track facilities in 1869. Between 1885 and 1888 much of the station was rebuilt by the Royal Bavarian State Railways. On 9 November 1888, the Renaissance revival entrance building was opened with a spacious entrance hall, three waiting rooms and a room for royalty. A luggage train connected the luggage office with the three platforms and five tracks. The wings of the entrance building, which had been part of the previous station building, were raised to three storeys, obscuring the perspective of the buildings from the station forecourt. The central building had two storeys.  The opening of the Außerfern Railway to Pfronten on 1 December 1895 and the line to Isny on 15 October 1909 led to further changes to the station.

On 1 July 1907, the Kempten bypass railway was opened, which relieved the terminal station of through traffic, especially freight trains. The bypass connected the lines from Neu-Ulm, Kaufbeuren and Pfronten directly to the railway to Immenstadt. A new bridge over the Iller was erected for the bypass; it is an arched bridge made of tamped concrete with a length of 155 metres and a main vault with a clearance of 64.5 metres, crossing the river at a height of 33 metres. North the bridge of the bypass line two more tamped concrete bridges were built on the access line to the terminal station. The wood truss bridge formerly used by the line was converted into a road bridge. A marshalling yard was built on the bypass line for the marshalling of freight trains from Bavaria and neighbouring countries in the northeast towards Lake Constance, Switzerland and south western Europe; it had a capacity of 1,200 wagons per day. At the same time the engine depot was moved about two kilometres from the terminal station to the south of the marshalling yard. In 1933, the yard lost its national significance, because long-distance freight trains ran over the newly electrified Ulm–Augsburg line and avoided the hilly Allgäu line.

From 1912, some “D-trains” (D-Züge: long-distance expresses) ran on the bypass line. All D-trains ran on the bypass line from the winter timetable of 1925/26. Instead of stopping at the Hauptbahnhof, trains stopped at Kempten-Hegge station, which was connected by shuttle trains, most recently railbuses, to the main station, 3.6 km away.

In the 1960s, Kempten station handled about 10,000 daily passengers, of which 40% was through traffic, 20% represented transferring passengers and 40% was local traffic. Each day it was served by 200 passenger trains and 42 freight trains.

Through station of 1969 
In 1961, a fundamental reshaping of the Kempten railway facilities was approved. Feasibility studies showed that the construction of a new through station would cost twice as much as the required refurbishment of the existing station, but would result in a significant reduction in operating costs. The city of Kempten expected that the through station would improve the difficult traffic conditions of the inner city. The best location for the new station proved to be at the marshalling yard, approximately one kilometre south of the station. The access lines were able to follow the former route of the bypass railway. To make the project financially feasible, the line would use the bridge over the Iller used by the bypass.

Construction began in 1965. A total of 300,000 m³ earth was moved and 34 kilometres of track and 180 sets of points were installed or re-laid.  Under the original plan the passenger station would have had four platforms with seven platform tracks, but it was decided to dispense with the construction of a fourth platform for the time being, because of a decline in the volume of traffic. The station building was built west of the platforms and was planned to handle ticket sales of 1,500 and the clearance of 8.5 tons of luggage each day. The station building was built as a four-storey building with 14,000 cubic metres of enclosed space, including offices of Deutsche Bundesbahn (DB), equipment for rail operations and a restaurant with 85 seats. Particular importance was attached to the seven metre wide tunnel to the platforms, the first time that DB had installed as a common structure for the transport of luggage and passengers. The station forecourt was built with parking lots, bus stops and a taxi stand and connected by a grade-separated interchange with federal highway 19. North of the square a new office building for Deutsche Bundespost was built. A relay interlocking was built south of the entrance building, replaced eleven old signal boxes.

The depot east of the passenger station was significantly reduced in scope after the switch from steam to diesel traction. The two roundhouses with 45 stalls were demolished. In the late 1960s, the depot was the location of 95 diesel locomotives, including 20 railbuses and 20 shunting locomotives. In 1950, 55 steam locomotives had been located in Kempten. The traction change meant that the number of employees in the depot dropped from 269 to 170.

The total cost in 1972 of the remodelling of the station was DM 39.7 million.

The old terminal station was demolished; Kempten-Hegge station was also closed after the commissioning of the new station. An educational complex, a shopping centre (Forum Allgäu) and an events hall (BigBOX Allgäu) were established in the former station area. The Iller bridge on the station approach was converted into a road bridge and the earlier wooden bridge which had been converted to a road bridge was converted again for cyclists and pedestrians.

Infrastructure
Several bus routes to downtown and the surrounding communities operate from the bus stop in the station forecourt. The station building was renovated and modernised in 2008. It has three ticket offices and five ticket machines. Likewise, several shops have been established in the side rooms. The main entrance is from the west, where there are also bus and taxi connections. There are also parking facilities. East of the platforms are long-term parking spaces, from which there is direct access is possible to the platform by subway.

The tracks of Kempten station are typically used as follows:

Operations 

The following long-haul and regional routes serve Kempten station:

Notes

References

External links 

Railway stations in Bavaria
Railway stations in Germany opened in 1852
Railway stations in Germany opened in 1969
1852 establishments in Bavaria
Kempten